Mohammed Ali Tewfik (9 November 1875 – 18 March 1955) was the heir presumptive of Egypt and Sudan in the periods 1892–1899 and 1936–1952. He was a member of the Muhammad Ali Dynasty.

Regent
He was the son of Khedive Tewfik I and  Emina Ilhamy, and the younger brother of Khedive Abbas II. Following the death of King Fuad I in 1936, Prince Mohammed Ali served briefly as the chief regent for the 16-year-old King Farouk I until his coronation.

In January 1952, his hopes of ruling were ended by the birth of King Farouk's son Ahmed Fuad. In 1953 Egypt was declared a republic and Prince Mohammed Ali lived the rest of his life in exile and died in Lausanne, Switzerland, in 1955.

Personal life and wealth 
Mohammed Ali Tewfik had a great palace, Al Manial, which he had built in the early 20th century, that contains many artifacts in a vintage architectural ambience. It is open to the public as the Manial Palace and Museum, in Cairo. The palace has large number of rooms with different decoration which has either an Egyptian style or decoration styles around the world.

Like his ancestor Abbas Pasha I, he loved and breed Arabian horses. In 1936 he also wrote a Book entitled "Breeding of Pure Bred Arabian Horses".

He married morganatically in 1941, the former French actress Suzanne Hémon.

Notable published works 
 Mon journal de voyage en Afrique du sud (1923).
 Breeding of Purebred Arab Horses (1936).
 Souvenirs de Jeunesse: Le Theresianum (Vienne de mon temps) (1948).
 Ma jeunesse à Paris (1950).

Honours
 1911: Grand Cordon of the Order of Leopold.

Ancestry

References

1875 births
1955 deaths
20th-century Regents of Egypt
Muhammad Ali dynasty
Egyptian nobility
Egyptian princes
Heirs to the Egyptian throne
Regents of Egypt
Egyptian emigrants to Switzerland
Egyptian exiles

Non-inheriting heirs presumptive